Stephan Schulz-Winge (born September 13, 1974) is a German former footballer who played as a midfielder. He spent four seasons in the Bundesliga with Borussia Mönchengladbach.

References

1974 births
Living people
German footballers
Association football midfielders
Borussia Mönchengladbach players
Borussia Mönchengladbach II players
FC 08 Homburg players
VfB Remscheid players
KFC Uerdingen 05 players
1. FC Kleve players
TuRU Düsseldorf players
Bundesliga players
Sportspeople from Neuss
Footballers from North Rhine-Westphalia